Matthew "Matty" Fleming (born 13 January 1996) is an English professional rugby league footballer who plays as a  for the Widnes Vikings in the Betfred Championship.

Fleming played for St Helens in the Super League, and on loan from Saints at the Leigh Centurions in the top flight. He played for the London Broncos in the Championship and the Betfred Super League, and spent time on loan from the Broncos at the London Skolars in League 1.

Personal
He attended Bridgewater High School, Warrington and played junior rugby for Warrington Rugby Union Club until aged 16, when he joined the Wolves Scholarship programme, also playing for Bold Miners RLFC.

Career
Fleming made his Saints début on 17 April 2015 in a Super League match against Leeds.

Fleming made his first start for London in the round 3 victory over Featherstone Rovers.

References

External links
London Broncos profile
Saints Heritage Society profile
SL profile

1996 births
Living people
Dewsbury Rams players
English rugby league players
Leigh Leopards players
London Broncos players
London Skolars players
Rugby league centres
Rugby league players from Warrington
St Helens R.F.C. players
Widnes Vikings players